Pelau is a traditional rice dish of the West Indies (Guadeloupe, Dominica and Caribbean countries such as Trinidad and Tobago, Grenada, Barbados and Saint Vincent and the Grenadines). Main ingredients are meat (usually chicken or beef), rice, pigeon peas or cowpeas, coconut milk and sugar; various vegetables and spices are optional ingredients. Spices used in the dish include cardamom, cloves, cumin and coriander. The meat is caramelised and the other ingredients are then added one by one, resulting in a dark brown stew.

An alternative preparation method is to sauté the meat, precook the rice, prepare the dish and bake it in the oven. Side dishes are optional; coleslaw is a typical one.

Pelau shares its origins with pilaf, a rice dish from Central Asia, the Middle East, East Africa, South Asia, and Spain, with their original version of their dish, Paella. Pelau is a Creole dish. When the island was under Spanish colonial rule, their version of Paella was passed down to the slaves who transformed the dish. The caramelisation of the meat goes back to African preparation traditions. Over the course of time, the basic method of preparing pilaf, the caramelisation of meat and influences of the Trinidadian cuisine (especially with regards to available ingredients) mingled into today's pelau.

See also

 List of rice dishes

References

Further reading

External links 
 Video tutorial, part 1
 Video tutorial, part 2
 Preparation instructions

Barbadian cuisine
Grenadian cuisine
Rice dishes
Saint Lucian cuisine
Saint Vincent and the Grenadines cuisine
Trinidad and Tobago cuisine